Paul Haarhuis and Mark Koevermans were the defending champions, but Koevermans did not compete this year.

Haarhuis teamed up with Jacco Eltingh and successfully defended his title, by defeating Hendrik Jan Davids and Libor Pimek 4–6, 6–2, 7–5 in the final.

Seeds

Draw

Draw

References

External links
 Official results archive (ATP)
 Official results archive (ITF)

Doubles